Stephens is an unincorporated community in northwest Callaway County, in the U.S. state of Missouri. The community is one mile east of Cedar Creek and the Callaway-Boone county line. Lindbergh on I-70 lies 1.5 miles to the south.

History
The community had a country store called Stephens Store. The store had the name of its owner, T. L. Stephens. A post office called Stephens Store was established in 1862, the name was changed to Stephens in 1912, and the post office closed in 1957.

References

Unincorporated communities in Callaway County, Missouri
Unincorporated communities in Missouri
Jefferson City metropolitan area